James French Strother (June 29, 1868 – April 10, 1930) was the grandson of Congressman James French Strother (1811-1860) of Virginia and great-grandson of Congressman George French Strother, also of Virginia.  Strother was a lawyer, judge, and U. S. Representative from West Virginia.

Strother was born near Pearisburg in Giles County on June 29, 1868.  He attend  public schools, the private Pearisburg Academy, Virginia Agricultural and Mechanical College in Blacksburg, and the University of Virginia School of Law.

After graduation, Strother become the deputy collector of internal revenue at Lynchburg, Virginia from 1890 to 1893.  He studied law at the University of Virginia at Charlottesville and was admitted to the bar in 1894 and started his law practice in Pearisburg the same year. In 1895 Strother moved his law practice to Welch in McDowell County, West Virginia. He was appointed judge of the criminal court of McDowell County by Gov. Albert B. White on January 1, 1905, and was elected to the same post three times, serving until he resigned on September 30, 1924.

Strother was elected from West Virginia's 5th District as a Republican to the Sixty-ninth and Seventieth Congresses (March 4, 1925 - March 3, 1929).  He was not a candidate for renomination in 1928.  Congressman Strother died in Welch, on April 10, 1930 and was interred in Monte Vista Cemetery, Bluefield, West Virginia.

External links 

 

People from Pearisburg, Virginia
People from Welch, West Virginia
1868 births
1930 deaths
West Virginia lawyers
Virginia Tech alumni
University of Virginia School of Law alumni
Virginia lawyers
American judges
Strother family
Republican Party members of the United States House of Representatives from West Virginia